America's Cup is an international yachting competition.

America's Cup may also refer to:

 America Baseball Cup, a baseball competition; see 2008 America Cup (Baseball)
 American Cup, a defunct US soccer competition
 American Cup (gymnastics), a gymnastics competition held in the US
 America's Cup (rugby league), a rugby league football competition
 Americas Cup (golf), an amateur golf tournament played between the US, Canada and Mexico
 Volleyball America's Cup

See also 
 Copa America (disambiguation) 
 America's Cup yacht class
 U.S. Cup of soccer
 U.S. Open Cup of soccer